William Brandford Griffith can refer to:
William Brandford Griffith (Governor) (1824–1897), Governor of the Gold Coast
William Brandford Griffith (judge) (1858–1939), his son, Chief Justice of the Gold Coast